Founded in 1991, The Architecture Foundation is Britain's oldest independent architecture centre. It examines contemporary issues in architectural theory and practice, through a public programme that has involved exhibitions, competitions publications, lectures, films and debates.

The organisation ran the Yard Gallery in Clerkenwell as a temporary space experimenting in different ways of exhibiting and communicating architecture before moving to Carmody Groarke-designed headquarters in Southwark.  Under the direction of Sarah Ichioka it gave itself a greater international remit, manifesting itself in 2009 through a series of exchange programmes. The Southwark headquarters also operated a project space, again hosting a variety of exhibitions, installations and talks.

The Architecture Foundation left the Southwark space in 2014 due to financial problems following the withdrawal of Arts Council funding. In 2015 it co-located with the Sir John Cass Faculty of Art, Architecture and Design at London Metropolitan University's Central House in Aldwych. In 2015 it appointed its current Director, Ellis Woodman, who was tasked with restructuring the organisation on the basis of a private funding model. In the same year Phineas Harper joined as deputy director.  Following London Metropolitan University's sale of Central House in 2016 the Architecture Foundation relocated to The Royal College of Art in Kensington.

Since December 2019, Cindy Walters, co-founder and director of Walters & Cohen Architects has served as chair of The Architecture Foundation's board of Trustees.  Walters is the Architecture Foundation's fifth chair, following Richard Rogers, Will Alsop, Brian Clarke and most recently Simon Allford, co-founder and director of Allford Hall Monaghan Morris.

References

External links 
The Architecture Foundation

Architecture organisations based in the United Kingdom